The 1991–92 NBA season was the Charlotte Hornets' fourth season in the National Basketball Association. With the first overall pick in the 1991 NBA draft, the Hornets selected UNLV star Larry Johnson. Under new head coach Allan Bristow, the Hornets would get off to a slow start losing 8 of their first 9 games. At midseason, the team traded Rex Chapman to the Washington Bullets in exchange for Tom Hammonds, who was out for the season with a groin injury he sustained with the Bullets. The Hornets would get stronger winning 9 of 13 games in February, on their way to finishing sixth in the Central Division with a record of 31 wins and 51 losses, a five-game improvement over the previous season.

Johnson averaged 19.2 points and 11.0 rebounds per game, as he won the 1992 NBA Rookie of the Year Award, and was named to the NBA All-Rookie First Team. He also participated in the Slam Dunk Contest during the All-Star Weekend in Orlando. In addition, second-year star Kendall Gill averaged 20.5 points and 1.9 steals per game, while sixth man Dell Curry provided the team with 15.7 points per game off the bench, and Johnny Newman contributed 15.3 points per game. Kenny Gattison averaged 12.7 points and 7.1 rebounds per game, while J.R. Reid provided with 11.0 points and 6.2 rebounds per game, but only played 51 games due to injury, and Muggsy Bogues contributed 8.9 points, 9.1 assists and 2.1 steals per game. The Hornets led the NBA in home-game attendance for the third time in four seasons.

Draft picks

Roster

Roster Notes
 Power forward Tom Hammonds was acquired from the Washington Bullets at midseason, but did not play for the Hornets this season due to a groin injury.

Regular season

Season standings

z – clinched division title
y – clinched division title
x – clinched playoff spot

Record vs. opponents

Game log

Player statistics

Awards and records
 Larry Johnson, NBA Rookie of the Year Award
 Larry Johnson, NBA All-Rookie Team 1st Team

Transactions
 July 15, 1991

Waived Randolph Keys.
 September 4, 1991

Signed Anthony Frederick as a free agent.
 October 10, 1991

Signed Scott Haffner as a free agent.
 October 11, 1991

Waived Scott Haffner.
 October 31, 1991

Claimed Greg Grant on waivers from the Indiana Pacers.
 November 5, 1991

Waived Kevin Lynch.
 December 9, 1991

Signed Elliot Perry as a free agent.

Waived Greg Grant.
 December 11, 1991

Signed Tony Massenburg as a free agent.
 December 30, 1991

Signed Ron Grandison as a free agent.
 January 1, 1992

Signed Ron Grandison to the first of two 10-day contracts.
 January 2, 1992

Released Michael Ansley.
 January 7, 1992

Waived Ron Grandison.

Waived Tony Massenburg.
 January 10, 1992

Signed Michael Ansley to a 10-day contract.
 February 15, 1992

Signed Cedric Hunter to a 10-day contract.
 February 19, 1992

Traded Rex Chapman to the Washington Bullets for Tom Hammonds.
 February 20, 1992

Waived Cedric Hunter.

References

Charlotte Hornets seasons
Charlotte Hornets
Tar
Tar